A Chorus Ending is a 1951 crime novel by the British writer Ernest Raymond. Like his most celebrated work We, the Accused it was inspired by the Doctor Crippen case.

Synopsis
Everett Armidy, a modest employee at the Hoxley Green reference library becomes drawn into a passionate affair, which ends tragically in his committing murder.

References

Bibliography
 Snell, Keith. The Bibliography of Regional Fiction in Britain and Ireland, 1800–2000. Routledge, 2017.
 Trestrail, John H. Criminal Poisoning: Investigational Guide for Law Enforcement, Toxicologists, Forensic Scientists, and Attorneys. Springer Science & Business Media, 2007.

1951 British novels
Novels set in England
British crime novels
Novels by Ernest Raymond
Cassell (publisher) books